Fatima Whitbread,  (3 March 1961) is a British retired javelin thrower. Whitbread went on to win the European title that year, and took the gold medal at the 1987 World Championships. She is also a two-time Olympic medallist, winning bronze at the 1984 Summer Olympics and silver at the 1988 Summer Olympics. She was voted BBC Sports Personality of the Year in 1987.

After a difficult early childhood, Fatima Vedad was adopted by the family of Margaret Whitbread, a javelin coach. Whitbread won the 1977 English Schools' Athletics Championships intermediate title, and was selected for the 1978 Commonwealth Games, where she finished sixth. The following year, she took gold at the 1979 European Athletics Junior Championships. During her career, she had a well-publicised rivalry with another British javelin athlete, Tessa Sanderson. Whitbread's later career was affected by a long-term shoulder injury, which she believed dated back to her world record throw in 1986. The 1990 UK Athletics Championships was the last event in which she participated, sustaining a further shoulder injury there. In 1992 she formally retired from competition.

Whitbread has appeared on several television programmes, including I'm a Celebrity... Get Me Out of Here! in 2011. She was named the Sports Writers' Association Sportswoman of the Year in 1986 and 1987. She was appointed a Member of the Order of the British Empire (MBE) in the 1987 Birthday Honours, for services to athletics.

Early life
Fatima Vedad was born on 3 March 1961 in Stoke Newington, London, to a Turkish Cypriot mother and Greek Cypriot father. She grew up in a series of children's homes, occasionally being left in the care of her abusive biological mother. In a 2003 interview with The Observer, she said, "it was a nightmare of a childhood and it was only because I loved sport so much that I got through it and met my true mother."

Vedad started throwing the javelin aged 11. According to her account, she had taken up an interest in track and field events after being inspired by the myth of Atalanta, "whom no man could outrun except by cheating, and whose javelin killed a terrible monster"; and by Mary Peters, who won the gold medal at the 1972 Summer Olympics' women's pentathlon. Vedad met javelin thrower David Ottley at a stadium and asked him if she could use his javelin. He asked her to wait until the coach arrived. The coach was Margaret Whitbread, a physical education teacher at a local school, whom Vedad had previously met when Whitbread refereed a netball match that she played in. After discovering that Vedad stayed at a children's home, Margaret Whitbread passed on some boots and a javelin from a girl who had retired from the event. Three years later, Vedad was adopted by Margaret Whitbread and her family. She spent her teenage years in Chadwell St Mary, Essex, where she attended the Torells School in nearby Grays.

Career

Early career
She placed sixth in the javelin throw at the 1978 Commonwealth Games, throwing . Whitbread won gold in the javelin event at the 1979 European Athletics Junior Championships, throwing . She was selected for the 1980 Summer Olympics event, but, achieving only
, she failed to qualify for the final. At the 1982 Commonwealth Games, Whitbread took the bronze medal, throwing , which was  behind champion Sue Howland, from Australia.

She led throughout the final until Tiina Lillak bettered her mark with her last throw of the contest. A few days before the 1984 Summer Olympics, Whitbread had a stomach operation but was still able to travel to the Games and compete. Lillak, who had a stress fracture in her right foot, won the silver medal. After the result, Whitbread commented that "I am so disappointed... I was not right on the night."

Whitbread sat down crying on the field after the result for around 30 minutes. After the medal ceremony, she commented, while still visibly upset: "12 years of hard work. Still no [gold] medal... I've waited two long years since [the 1984 Summer Olympics]. And now I'm humiliated." Sanderson, who had placed behind Whitbread in all of their seven post-1984 Olympics meetings before the Games, said "I don't mind losing to Fatima in the smaller competitions, but not in the big ones."

World record, and European and World championship wins
She was the first British athlete to set a world record in a throwing event. Whitbread later wrote that "All the years of training had finally come to something... I went on my lap of honour... Spontaneously, I wiggled my hips in happiness, a victory wiggle."

Whitbread qualified for the final of the 1987 World Championships in second place behind Felke. Sanderson was fourth. Her celebratory wiggles after defeating Felke in the World and European event became well known in the UK. She was voted winner of the BBC Sports Personality of the Year award in 1987. David Powell wrote in The Times, that "To that practiced smile, she has added the 'Whitbread wiggle'. She is succeeding in bringing personality to her event in the same way that Willie Banks did to the triple jump."

Later career
In the months leading up to the 1988 Summer Olympics in Seoul, Whitbread suffered from several ailments: a shoulder injury, boils, glandular fever and problems with her gums. Whitbread won the silver medal behind Felke, with a throw that, although her best of the season, was some four metres less than her rival. Whitbread commented "If I had to be beaten, I am glad it was by Petra."

Whitbread's later career was affected by a long-term shoulder injury, which she believed dated back to her world record throw in 1986. The 1990 UK Athletics Championships was the last event that she participated in, and she sustained a further shoulder injury there. In 1992 she formally retired from competition.

Rivalry with Tessa Sanderson
Alan Hubbard wrote in a 1990 article in The Observer about Whitbread and Sanderson that "their hate-hate relationship has been one of the most enduring in British sport," lasting almost a decade. In 2009, Tom Lamont commented in The Guardian that "Whitbread and Sanderson were always uneasy rivals and the enmity that developed during their overlapping careers became as famous as their achievements, and seems to survive in their retirement." Hubbard cited Sanderson's perception that Whitbread received preferential treatment from the British Amateur Athletic Board. The Board's promotions officer, Andy Norman, who had a role in setting British athletes' fees, was a family friend of Whitbread and her mother. In 1985, Whitbread often participated in international events but Sanderson took part in only one in the season up to June 1985. Sanderson claimed that this was because she lacked supporters in the meetings where representatives were determined; she said that "Fatima has Andy Norman looking after her in meetings ... and, of course, her mother, Margaret, is the national event coach". In 1987, Sanderson threatened to boycott six official athletics events, for which she was to be paid £1,000 each by British Athletics compared to Whitbread's £10,000. Sanderson also objected to the Whitbreads' endorsement of Howland, who competed at the 1990 Commonwealth Games after a two-year doping suspension, since Howland was Australian, and Sanderson felt they should have supported British athletes instead.

During their respective careers, Whitbread gained one world and one European title; Sanderson won an Olympic and three Commonwealth golds. In all, Sanderson placed higher in 27 of the 45 times that they faced each other in competition, although Whitbread had the better results of the pair from 1984 to 1987. In 1993, coach Peter Lawler favourably compared Whitbread's technique to Sanderson's, writing in IAAF New Studies in Athletics that "the alignments of Whitbread and [Mick] Hill are as straight as a cricket text book's bat. Whitbread perfected the turning on to the shaft while Sanderson often sagged through the delivery."

Personal life
Whitbread wrote in her 2012 autobiography that she began a personal relationship with Norman shortly after his divorce in 1986. In 1993, journalist Cliff Temple investigated claims that members of the Chafford Hundred Athletic Club, which was run by Whitbread and included leading athletes personally managed by her fiancé Norman, received preferential treatment from Norman in his role as promotions officer of the British Athletics Federation (BAF). Temple authored an article in The Sunday Times suggesting that there could be a conflict of interests. Temple killed himself in January 1994. It emerged during the inquest into Temple's death that Norman had threatened and falsely smeared him. Norman spread rumours that Temple had sexually harassed Shireen Bailey, whom Temple coached. Bailey denied the claims. Norman was dismissed from his job as promotions officer for the BAF following the federation's inquiry into the matter. The inquest concluded that although the end of Temple's marriage was a contributing factor to his suicide, that the allegations by Norman were the other factor, and had "tipped the balance".

In 1997, Whitbread married Norman in Copthorne, West Sussex. The couple, who had a son together, divorced in 2006. Norman died of a heart attack in 2007.

Whitbread has published two autobiographies written with Adrianne Blue, Fatima: The Autobiography of Fatima Whitbread in 1988, and Survivor: The Shocking and Inspiring Story of a True Champion in 2012.

Whitbread is a Christian but, in her own words, "not devout."

Honours and awards
Whitbread was runner-up to Nigel Mansell in the 1986 BBC Sports Personality of the Year Awards, and won the title the following year. She was named the Sports Writers' Association Sportswoman of the Year in 1986 and 1987. She was appointed a Member of the Order of the British Empire (MBE) in the 1987 Birthday Honours, for services to athletics.

In media
Whitbread has been a guest on television programmes including A Question of Sport (on which she first appeared in 1984), The Little and Large Show (1987 and 1988) and The Wright Stuff (2012). In 1989, she was one of the celebrities with experience of fostering or adoption who took part in Find a Family on ITV. The series featured the celebrities' own reflections, and also highlighted specific children, inviting viewers to contact the programme if they were interesting in fostering or adopting them.

In January 1995 Whitbread was interviewed by Andrew Neil, on his one-on-one show Is This Your Life? on Channel 4 which included discussion of Cliff Temple's suicide. Writing in The Guardian, Nancy Banks-Smith described how Whitbread had "stonewalled with stoicism and without sweating" and been unclear in her answers about this. Whitbread also spoke about her unhappiness at how Ben Johnson had been treated after being found doping with steroids. Neil's treatment of Whitbread attracted viewer complaints.

She was a featured "masked celebrity" on Celebrity Wrestling in 2005, and lost her bout against Victoria Silvstedt.

In November 2011, Whitbread took part in the ITV show I'm a Celebrity... Get Me Out of Here! Whitbread and fellow campmate Antony Cotton left on 2 December 2011, placing her third. One of the challenges on the show involved her wearing a helmet containing about 7,500 cockroaches. The segment was halted after one of the insects crawled up her nose. It was removed by flushing it out through her mouth with water.

In 2012, she was a regular fitness expert appearing on This Morning. Later that year, the stand-alone documentary Fatima Whitbread: Growing Up in Care featured Whitbread's reflections on her own troubled childhood, and her conversations with others who had experienced serious problems from their parent and problems with the UK care system. In The Guardian, David Stubbs wrote "More emotional than forensic, this is compulsory viewing nonetheless." In 2020, she trekked the Sultans Trail for BBC Two's Pilgrimage: Road to Istanbul.

Career statistics

International competitions
The table shows Whitbread's performances representing Great Britain and England in international competitions. (q) Indicates overall position in qualifying round.

National titles
 1977 English Schools' Athletics Championships (intermediate)
 AAA Junior Championships (under 17): 1977
 6 times AAA champion: 1981, 1982, 1983, 1984, 1986, 1987
 8 times UK Athletics Champion: 1981, 1982, 1983, 1984, 1985, 1986, 1987, 1988

Publications

Television and radio

Explanatory notes

References

External links

 
 Team GB profile

1961 births
Athletes (track and field) at the 1980 Summer Olympics
Athletes (track and field) at the 1982 Commonwealth Games
Athletes (track and field) at the 1986 Commonwealth Games
Athletes (track and field) at the 1984 Summer Olympics
Athletes (track and field) at the 1988 Summer Olympics
BBC Sports Personality of the Year winners
Commonwealth Games silver medallists for England
Commonwealth Games bronze medallists for England
English female javelin throwers
English adoptees
English autobiographers
English people of Greek Cypriot descent
English people of Turkish Cypriot descent
European Athletics Championships medalists
I'm a Celebrity...Get Me Out of Here! (British TV series) participants
Living people
Members of the Order of the British Empire
Olympic athletes of Great Britain
Olympic bronze medallists for Great Britain
Olympic silver medallists for Great Britain
World Athletics Championships medalists
People educated at Torells School
People from Chadwell St Mary
People from Stoke Newington
Sportspeople of Turkish Cypriot descent
Medalists at the 1988 Summer Olympics
Medalists at the 1984 Summer Olympics
Olympic silver medalists in athletics (track and field)
Olympic bronze medalists in athletics (track and field)
Commonwealth Games medallists in athletics
Sportspeople from Essex
Women autobiographers
World Athletics Championships winners
Medallists at the 1982 Commonwealth Games
Medallists at the 1986 Commonwealth Games